The Biju Krushak Kalyan Yojana or BKKY is a health insurance scheme for the farmers in the state of Odisha, India. The Biju Krushak Kalyan Yojana (BKKY) was launched by Chief Minister of Odisha, Sri Naveen Patnaik, in Angul district of Odisha to provide people financial support through health and accident insurance.  There are many hospitals, Community Health Centre (CHCs) in each district of Odisha under Biju Krushak Kalya Yojana (BKKY) to provide people health care with low cost.

Insurance Companies Selected
 IFFCO-TOKIO General Insurance
 National Insurance
 Reliance General Insurance
 The New India Insurance

References

External links
 Official Website of Biju Krushak Kalyan Yojana

Health insurance in India
Government schemes in Odisha
Agriculture in Odisha